
MDNP may refer to:

 Mid Dorset and North Poole (UK Parliament constituency), a parliamentary constituency in South West England
 Hungarian Democratic People's Party, a former political party in Hungary